Eucosma glebana is a species of moth of the family Tortricidae. It is found in China (Zhejiang, Shaanxi), Korea, Japan and Russia.

The wingspan is 19–21 mm.

References

Moths described in 1883
Eucosmini